Castuera is a municipality in the province of Badajoz, Extremadura, Spain. According to the 2014 census, the municipality has a population of 6,255 inhabitants.

Notable people
Maria Dolores Aguilar

References

External links

Municipalities in the Province of Badajoz